Shahsevan rug or Shahsevan Kilim is the Iranian Style, handmade by the Shahsevans in the Azerbaijan region of Iran.

See also
 Heriz rug
 Tabriz rug
 Ardabil carpet

References
 *

Persian rugs and carpets
Iranian culture
Azerbaijani culture
Azerbaijani rugs and carpets
Zanjan Province
Ardabil Province